John Ephraim Taylor (11 September 1924 – 9 August 1970) was an English professional footballer who played as an  inside forward.

Career
Born in Chilton, Taylor played for Stockton, Luton Town, Wolverhampton Wanderers, Notts County and Bradford (Park Avenue).

References

1924 births
1970 deaths
English footballers
Stockton F.C. players
Luton Town F.C. players
Wolverhampton Wanderers F.C. players
Notts County F.C. players
Bradford (Park Avenue) A.F.C. players
English Football League players
Association football inside forwards